is a private university in Naha, Okinawa, Japan. The predecessor of the school was founded in 1961, and it was chartered as a university in 1974.

External links
 Official website 

Educational institutions established in 1961
Private universities and colleges in Japan
Universities and colleges in Okinawa Prefecture
1961 establishments in Okinawa